International Motor Show may refer to one of these motor shows:

Australian International Motor Show
Bangkok International Motor Show
British International Motor Show
Dubai International Motor Show
Frankfurt International Motor Show
Indonesia International Motor Show
Philippine International Motor Show

See also
International Auto Show (disambiguation)